Roberto Sandoval Castañeda (born 15 November 1969) is a Mexican politician affiliated with the Institutional Revolutionary Party. From 2011 to 2017 he served as Governor of Nayarit. He also served as Municipal President of Tepic between 2008 and 2011.

Known as "El Roberto", Governor Sandoval became one of the richest men in Nayarit, allegedly by embezzling state funds, extorting businesses, overseeing kidnapping for ransom, and closely collaborating with drug dealers. 

The United States Department of the Treasury declared Roberto Sandoval Castañeda and judge Isidro Avelar Gutiérrez "significant drug dealers" on May 17, 2019. Six other individuals and six corporations were similarly sanctioned. Sandoval Castañeda, his wife, his and children were banned from entering the United States on February 28, 2020.

A Mexican judge ordered the arrest of Sandoval Castañeda and his daughter Lidy on charges of money laundering on March 1, 2021.

On June 6, 2021, Sandoval was arrested in Nuevo León by FGR agents, SEDENA, National Guard, and National Center of Intelligence of Nuevo León. His daughter was accompanying him.

References

1969 births
Living people
Politicians from Tepic, Nayarit
Governors of Nayarit
Institutional Revolutionary Party politicians
People sanctioned under the Foreign Narcotics Kingpin Designation Act
21st-century Mexican politicians